Jessie Belle Rittenhouse Scollard (December 8, 1869 – September 28, 1948), daughter of John Edward and Mary (MacArthur) Rittenhouse, was a literary critic, compiler of anthologies, and poet.

Life
After graduating in 1890 from Genesee Wesleyan Seminary in Lima, New York, Rittenhouse taught school in Cairo, Illinois and Grand Haven, Michigan. Her literary career began with book reviews in Buffalo and Rochester, New York, and led to a year as a reporter for the Rochester Democrat and Chronicle in 1894. In 1899 she moved to Boston to begin her literary career in earnest. From 1905 to 1915 Rittenhouse lived in New York City, where she was poetry reviewer for the New York Times Review of Books. From 1914 to 1924 she conducted lecture tours. In 1914 Rittenhouse helped to found the Poetry Society of America, of which she was secretary for 10 years.

Rittenhouse married fellow poet Clinton Scollard in 1924.

In the course of her career, Rittenhouse corresponded with numerous contemporary poets, such as John Myers O'Hara, Margaret Widdemer, and Arthur Guiterman. Her poems were set to music by many composers, including Samuel Barber, Noble Cain, Alice Reber Fish, Ethel Glenn Hier, Kirke Mechem, Frederick W. Vanderpool, Wintter Watts, and especially David Wendel Guion.

Late in her career, Rittenhouse moved to Winter Park, Florida, and became associated with Rollins College, where she was a lecturer in poetry.

The Poetry Society of America presented Rittenhouse the first Robert Frost Medal in 1930.

Jessie Belle Rittenhouse died at her home in Grosse Pointe Park, Michigan on September 28, 1948.

Works

Anthologies 
 The Lover's Rubáiyát (1904)
 Little Book of Modern Verse (1913)
 Little Book of American Poets (1915)
 Second Book of Modern Verse (1919)
 Little Book of Modern British Verse (1924)
 Third Book of Modern Verse (1927)
 The Singing Heart (1934) (Selected verses by Clinton Scollard)

Verse 
 The Door of Dreams (1918)
 The Lifted Cup (1921)
 The Secret Bird (1930)
 Moving Tide: New and Selected Lyrics (1939)

Edited with Clinton Scollard 
 The Bird-Lovers Anthology (1930)
 Patrician Rhymes (1932)

Autobiography 
 My House of Life (1934)

References

External links 
 
 
 
 A guide to the Jessie Rittenhouse Collection at Rollins College

 Select poems by Jessie Belle Rittenhouse

1869 births
1948 deaths
20th-century American poets
Women anthologists
American literary critics
Women literary critics
American women poets
American women journalists
20th-century American women writers
People from Mount Morris, New York
Writers from New York (state)
19th-century American journalists
19th-century American women writers
Rollins College faculty
20th-century American non-fiction writers
American women academics
American women critics